Pierre Fourcaud (27 March 1898 in St Petersburg – 2 May 1998 in Paris), was one of the first Frenchmen to rally to General Charles de Gaulle in July 1940.

He fought in the French army from 1916 to 1920 and again in 1940. Later when joining the free French secret service, he volunteered immediately to go back to France as a secret agent. 

He then became the most prominent agent of the French secret service founded in 1945, the SDECE, serving until 1956.

References
  Biography on the official website from Compagnons de la Libération
 Obituary in The Independent by Michael Foot

1898 births
1998 deaths
French Resistance members
French centenarians
Men centenarians
Companions of the Liberation
Emigrants from the Russian Empire to France